Ron Hoenig (born 21 April 1953) is an Australian barrister and current member for Heffron in the Parliament of New South Wales. He previously served as Mayor of the City of Botany Bay in New South Wales from 1981 to 2012, a record 31 years, before standing down and winning the 25 August Heffron by-election in the state parliament for the Labor Party.

Legal career
Hoenig was a practising barrister and public defender, who acted as the counsel assisting the inquiry into the death of Dianne Brimble, where he made recommendations that up to three of the persons assisting the inquiry could face prosecution. He defended David Dinh, who was accused of killing New South Wales MP John Newman. Dinh was acquitted by a jury. Hoenig later had to step back from performing public defender duties once he took office in the Legislative Assembly.

Local council
After being elected as an Alderman of the Municipality of Botany in September 1980, Hoenig was elected mayor in 1981 and became the first popularly-elected mayor of the council in 1983, with 85% of the vote. He was re-elected mayor in 1987 (unopposed), 1991 (80%), 1995 (88%), 1999 (unopposed), 2004 and 2008. Hoenig was mayor when Botany was proclaimed the City of Botany Bay on 11 May 1996.

During his time as mayor, Hoenig campaigned on various issues such as heritage protection, where he supported the establishment of the Botany Historical Trust in 1994 and commissioned the Botany Bay Heritage Study in 1996, as well as the non-expansion of both the Botany Port and Sydney Airport. He did not seek re-election at the 2012 local government elections.

State parliament
Hoenig was preselected as the Labor candidate for 25 August 2012 Heffron by-election in the New South Wales Legislative Assembly, following the parliamentary resignation of former Premier and state Labor MLA Kristina Keneally. Hoenig drew top spot on the ballot paper, with three other candidates from the CDP, Greens and Democrats. Hoenig won with a 60 percent primary and 70 percent two-candidate-preferred vote.

On 11 June 2021, Hoenig was appointed as the Manager of Opposition Business by Leader of the Opposition Chris Minns

Personal life
Hoenig's parents Ernest and Edith migrated to Australia after World War II. Edith was a Holocaust survivor born in Czechoslovakia and Ernest was born in Austria. Hoenig is married to Christine and has two sons; Benjamin and Matthew. Hoenig is a member of the Maroubra Synagogue.

References

1953 births
Living people
Mayors of Botany and Botany Bay
Members of the New South Wales Legislative Assembly
Australian Labor Party members of the Parliament of New South Wales
Australian barristers
New South Wales local councillors
Australian people of Austrian-Jewish descent
Australian people of Czech-Jewish descent
Jewish Australian politicians
21st-century Australian politicians
Public defenders